Duke Forest is a forest managed by Duke University for research, teaching, and recreation.  It is located in the edge of the Piedmont (United States) in Durham County, Orange County, and Alamance County in North Carolina.  Four of its six divisions lie within the triangle formed by Durham, Chapel Hill, and Hillsborough.

Description

The  Duke Forest is made up of six divisions which are fully accessible for teaching and research.  Numerous forest types and ecosystems, soils, and previous land uses are represented on the forest.  It is a resource unparalleled by any other university for its size, accessibility, length of management, and accumulation of long-term data (since 1931).

Like much of the North Carolina Piedmont, the forest was farmed for cotton.  After about a century of such management, the soils' native fertility was exhausted, and could no longer create the yields necessary to support farmers.  Then, in 1929, the Great Depression began.  Land was abandoned and secondary succession began.  Pioneer species such as loblolly pine, yellow poplar, and sweetgum quickly colonized these abandoned farm fields.  These trees now dominate much of the forest.

Some parts are dominated by oak and hickory trees.  These correspond to old woodlots between fields.  Many of these stands were never cleared for agriculture.  Thus, these stands bear the closest resemblance to precolonial conditions.

Divisions

Durham Division (Durham County)
Korstian Division (Orange County)
Edeburn (formerly 'Eno') Division (Orange County)
Blackwood Division (Orange County)
Hillsboro Division (Orange County)
Dailey Division (Alamance County)

Management

From inception, Duke Forest's priorities have been research and teaching.  The Forest initially supported the teaching and research activities of the newly created Duke School of Forestry. Limited areas are logged each year, providing revenue to support forest management, but also for each generation of Forestry students to study the patterns and timing of succession after different logging treatments. Activities in the forest have now broadened to include botany, zoology, soil science, geography, and many other fields, in addition to the forestry and environmental science activities of the present-day version of the Duke School of Forestry, the Nicholas School of the Environment.  The Duke University Lemur Center is located in Duke Forest, off Erwin Road.

The forest is visited every year by thousands of students from local schools and universities, and many other universities and organizations throughout the nation.  Research data and records are made available for use elsewhere, as well as at Duke.

Recreation

The Duke Forest has many roads and trails through some of the most scenic areas near Duke University, through woods with streams, flowers, and wildlife.  Limited public access, including biking, hiking, and horseback riding, is allowed on established forest roads as long as it does not conflict with research and teaching activities.  It also serves as home to the many runners on Duke's cross country running teams.

External links

 Duke Forest
 Nicholas School of the Environment and Earth Sciences
 Duke University
 Duke University Lemur Center

Urban forests in the United States
Forest
Research forests